Van Beuningen may refer to:

Coenraad van Beuningen, (1622-1693) Dutch businessman and politician
Geurt van Beuningen, (1565-1633) Dutch mayor
Daniël George van Beuningen, (1877-1955) Dutch businessman

Dutch-language surnames
Surnames of Dutch origin